Ognjen Čančarević (Serbian Cyrillic: Огњен Чанчаревић; born 25 September 1989) is a Serbian professional footballer who plays as a goalkeeper for FC Alashkert of the Armenian Premier League.

Career

Club
Čančarević has previously played with FK Sloboda Užice, GP Zlatibor, FK Sloga Bajina Bašta and FK Sevojno. He joined Radnički in summer 2009 and after playing two seasons in the Serbian First League they won promotion to the SuperLiga in 2011. Since 2018, he is Alashkert player.

International
He called up for a friendly match against United States, on 29 January 2017. However, he remained on the bench. Match ended 0-0.

Later, Cancarević was omitted from Serbia's 23-man squad for the 2018 FIFA World Cup in Russia.

Personal life
His father Milan was also a professional footballer and so is his cousin Luka.

Career statistics

Club

References

External links
 Ognjen Čančarević at Footballdatabase
 

1989 births
Living people
Sportspeople from Užice
Serbian footballers
Association football goalkeepers
FK Sloboda Užice players
FK Sevojno players
FK Radnički 1923 players
OFK Beograd players
FK Mladost Lučani players
FK Radnik Surdulica players
Serbian First League players
Serbian SuperLiga players